North East Mail is an Indian English-language newspaper published from Guwahati, Assam, India. This newspaper is published weekly.

See also 
 Seven Sisters Post

References

External links 
 

English-language newspapers published in India
Newspapers published in Assam